Thomas Mort (1 December 1897 – 6 June 1967) was an English footballer who played club football primarily for Aston Villa, as a left-back. He also made three appearances for the England national team.

Villa signed Mort from Rochdale for £1,000 in 1922 and along with Tommy Smart, was part of a defensive tandem known for Villa as "Death and Glory." He played 13 seasons with the club with 337 appearances. 

He was a cousin of Cardiff City defender Enoch Mort.

References

1897 births
1967 deaths
People from Kearsley
English footballers
Association football fullbacks
Aston Villa F.C. players
Rochdale A.F.C. players
England international footballers
Altrincham F.C. players
Lancashire Fusiliers soldiers
FA Cup Final players
British Army personnel of World War I